Baeothele is a monospecific genus of ovoviviparous velvet worm containing the single species Baeothele saukros. This species has 15 pairs of legs in both sexes. The type locality of this species is Wollemi National Park, New South Wales, Australia.

References

Further reading 
 

Onychophorans of Australasia
Onychophoran genera
Monotypic protostome genera
Fauna of New South Wales
Endemic fauna of Australia
Taxa named by Amanda Reid (malacologist)